Vålerenga Fotball Damer is the women's football branch of Vålerenga Fotball. Based in Oslo, the team plays in Norway's top league,  Toppserien. 

The team first won promotion to Toppserien in 2011 after earning promotion from the First Division. This made Vålerenga the third Norwegian club with both a men's team and a women's team in the top-tier league, and the first club to have its own women's team win promotion to Toppserien, as the two other clubs, Stabæk Fotball and Lillestrøm SK, inherited another club's women's team.

In 2020, the club made record by winning the Toppserien and the NM Kvinner, their first major titles after finishing runners-up at the previous editions.

Players

Current squad

Coaching staff

Notable former players

  Hanne Mellingsæter
  Solveig Gulbrandsen
  Tina Wulff
  Johanne Fridlund
  Ingrid Søndenå
  Maren Hauge
  Theresa Eslund
  Tinja-Riikka Korpela
  Jenna Dear
  Natasha Dowie
  Ingrid Schjelderup
  Isabell Herlovsen
  Ajara Njoya
  Sherida Spitse
  Sigrid Heien Hansen
  Celin Bizet Ildhusøy
  Marie Dølvik Markussen
  Rikke Marie Madsen
  Synne Jensen

Recent seasons 
{|class="wikitable"
|-bgcolor="#efefef"
! Season
! 
! Pos.
! Pl.
! W
! D
! L
! GS
! GA
! P
!Cup
!Notes
|-
|2010
|1. divisjon
|align=right|3
|align=right|22||align=right|11||align=right|6||align=right|5
|align=right|38||align=right|24||align=right|39
||Second round
|
|-
|2011
|1. divisjon
|align=right bgcolor=#DDFFDD| 1
|align=right|20||align=right|14||align=right|3||align=right|3
|align=right|52||align=right|22||align=right|45
||Third round
|Promoted to Toppserien
|-
|2012 
|Toppserien
|align=right |8
|align=right|22||align=right|6||align=right|5||align=right|11
|align=right|27||align=right|47||align=right|23
||Third round
|
|-
|2013 
|Toppserien
|align=right | 5
|align=right|22||align=right|8||align=right|8||align=right|6
|align=right|41||align=right|37||align=right|32
||Semi-final
|
|-
|2014 
|Toppserien
|align=right | 7
|align=right|22||align=right|9||align=right|3||align=right|10
|align=right|27||align=right|45||align=right|30
||Third round
|
|-
|2015 
|Toppserien
|align=right | 10
|align=right|22||align=right|6||align=right|3||align=right|13
|align=right|22||align=right|42||align=right|21
||Third round
|
|-
|2016 
|Toppserien
|align=right | 9
|align=right|22||align=right|6||align=right|5||align=right|11
|align=right|25||align=right|48||align=right|23
||Third round 
|
|-
|2017 
|Toppserien
|align=right | 7
|align=right|22||align=right|10||align=right|4||align=right|8
|align=right|38||align=right|33||align=right|34
|bgcolor=silver|Final
|
|-
|2018 
|Toppserien
|align=right | 6
|align=right|22||align=right|10||align=right|3||align=right|9
|align=right|37||align=right|35||align=right|33
||Quarter-final
|
|-
|2019 
|Toppserien
|align=right bgcolor=silver| 2
|align=right|22||align=right|14||align=right|4||align=right|4
|align=right|41||align=right|24||align=right|46
|bgcolor=silver|Final
|
|-
|2020
|Toppserien
|align=right bgcolor=gold | 1
|align=right|18||align=right|11||align=right|5||align=right|2
|align=right|39||align=right|14||align=right|38
|bgcolor=gold|Winners
|
|-
|2021
|Toppserien
|align=right | 4
|align=right|18||align=right|11||align=right|2||align=right|5
|align=right|46||align=right|17||align=right|35
|bgcolor=gold|Winners
|
|-
|rowspan=2|2022
|rowspan=2|Toppserien
|rowspan=2 align=right bgcolor=silver| 2
|align=right|18||align=right|12||align=right|3||align=right|3
|align=right|48||align=right|12||align=right|39
|rowspan=2|Quarter-final
|rowspan=2|
|-
|align=right|6||align=right|4||align=right|1||align=right|1
|align=right|16||align=right|3||align=right|15
|}
Source:

Honours
Toppserien:
Winners: 2020
Runners-up: 2019, 2022
1. divisjon:
Winners: 2011
Norwegian Women's Cup:
Winners: 2020, 2021
Runners-up: 2017, 2019

References

Vålerenga Fotball
Women's football clubs in Norway
Association football clubs established in 1913
1913 establishments in Norway
Football clubs in Oslo